Košický večer was a city evening paper in Košice, Slovakia. It was founded in 1969, making it the oldest evening paper in Slovakia.

History and profile
The newspaper was established in 1969 under the name Večer. In 1990 it was renamed as Košický večer. The paper was issued daily from Monday to Friday with a weekend supplement in Friday's issue until 2004 when it began to be published by the Petit Press and printed weekly on Fridays.

References

1969 establishments in Czechoslovakia
Mass media in Košice
Newspapers published in Slovakia
Publications established in 1969
Slovak-language newspapers